Leucozonia nassa, common name: the chestnut nassa, is a species of sea snail, a marine gastropod mollusk in the family Fasciolariidae, the spindle snails, the tulip snails and their allies.

Description
The shell size varies between 22 mm and 68 mm.

Distribution
This species is distributed in the Gulf of Mexico, the Caribbean Sea and the Lesser Antilles; in the Atlantic Ocean it is distributed from North Carolina to Central Brazil.

References

 Rosenberg, G., F. Moretzsohn, and E. F. García. 2009. Gastropoda (Mollusca) of the Gulf of Mexico, pp. 579–699 in Felder, D.L. and D.K. Camp (eds.), Gulf of Mexico – Origins, Waters, and Biota. Biodiversity. Texas A&M Press, College Station, Texas

External links
 

Fasciolariidae
Gastropods described in 1791